The Puruborá are an indigenous people that inhabit the Brazilian state of Rondônia. They form a society of about 200 individuals.

Localization
The Puruborá people inhabit the Aperoy village.

Historical personalities
Emília Nunes de Oliveira Puruborá was matriarch of the Puruborá people, who by means of her persistence kept the culture and traditional territory, though they had to buy it.

References

Indigenous peoples of South America
Rondônia